is a former Japanese Nippon Professional Baseball catcher. He played for the Kokutetsu Swallows from 1954 to 1960.

External links
Career statistics and player information from Baseball-Reference

1935 births
Living people
Japanese baseball players
Nippon Professional Baseball catchers
Kokutetsu Swallows players